Blanchelande College is a 4–18 mixed, Roman Catholic, private school and sixth form in Saint Andrew, Guernsey. It was established in 1902 and is located in the Roman Catholic Diocese of Portsmouth. It is the only fully mixed independent school in Guernsey.

The Department for Education categorises it as an overseas British school.

History 
Blanchelande College was established in 1902 and moved to its present site in Les Vauxbelets in 1999.

In 2011, the school suspended its sixth form provision due to falling numbers and would be reviewed in 2013. In February 2019, it was announced the school would be reopening its sixth form from September 2020 and will offer a range of A-Level courses. The decision to reopen was made due to demand from students and parents, its numbers having risen by more than 20% in the last 18 months, the introduction of boys to the senior school for the first time in September 2015, which made it the only fully mixed independent school in Guernsey, as well as its successful inspection report where it was rated 'excellent' by Independent Schools Inspectorate following its inspection in October 2018.

References

External links 
 

Roman Catholic private schools in the Diocese of Portsmouth
Catholic schools in the United Kingdom
Independent schools in Guernsey
Secondary schools in the Channel Islands
Religious organisations based in Guernsey
Educational institutions established in 1902
1902 establishments in Guernsey